Carl Georg Lange Barth (February 28, 1860 –  October 28, 1939) was a Norwegian-American mathematician, mechanical and consulting engineer, and lecturer at Harvard University. Barth is known as one of the foreman of scientific management, who improved and popularized the industrial use of compound slide rules.

Biography

Youth and education 
Carl Georg Barth was born in Christiania, Norway (now Oslo). He was the fourth child of Jakob Boeckman Barth (1822-1892), a lawyer and Adelaide Magdeline Lange Barth  (1828- 1897), daughter of a Danish clergyman. He received his early education in the public schools at Lillehammer.

He was a graduate from University at Christiania. He later attended the Royal Norwegian Navy technical school at Horten. In 1877, Barth started an apprenticeship in the navy yard at Karljohansvern in Horten.

Career 

In 1899, efficiency expert Frederick W. Taylor hired Barth  to work with him at Bethlehem Steel Company. Carl Barth helped to develop speed-and-feed-calculating slide rules.

In 1902, Taylor and Barth went to work for William Sellers at the machine tool firm of William Sellers & Company of Philadelphia. An account of their application of slide rules was published in the Transactions of the American Society of Mechanical Engineers in 1904.

Barth started in 1905 on his independent career as consulting engineer. Barth became an early consultant on scientific management and later taught at Harvard University.  Barth edited articles submitted to International Correspondence School of Scranton, Pennsylvania publication, the Home Study Magazine. In  1909, he undertook the installation of scientific management in the Watertown Arsenal at Watertown, Massachusetts.

Barth was a leftist and anticapitalist.

Family 
In March 1882, Barth married Henrike Jakobine Fredriksen (1857–1916). They were the parents of a daughter and two sons. After his first wife's death, he married Sophia Eugenia Roever (1873–1958).

Later years
In his later years, Barth worked on developing an improved method of instruction for calculus. However, poor health prevented him from publishing his work. He died of a heart attack at his home in Philadelphia in 1939.

Selected publications 
 Barth, Carl G. "Report on Fixing of Rates for Loading Pig Iron by Half Pigs on Buggies in the Yards." South Bethlehem, Pa (1900): 82-84.
 Carl Barth. Slide Rules for the Machine Shop as a Part of the Taylor System of Management. ASME, 1903.
 Barth, C. G. "The Transmission of Power by Leather Belting." Transactions of the American Society of Mechanical Engineers 31 (1909).
 Barth, Carl G. "Testimony of Carl G. Barth." Hearings of the US Commissions on Industrial Relations, 64th Congress, 1st. 1914.
 Barth, Carl G. "Standardization of Machine Tools." Transactions, ASME  Vol 38, 1916: 895-922.
 Barth, Carl G. Labor turnover: A mathematical discussion. Carl G. Barth & Son, 1919.
 Barth, C. G. "New Graphical Solution for Time Allowances in Task Setting." Management and Administration: 1943-44.

Patent
 Barth, Carl G., Henry L. Gantt, and Frederick W. Taylor. "Slide-rule." U.S. Patent No. 753,840. 8 Mar. 1904.
 Barth, Carl G. "Method and means for re-forming wheels having worn treads and flanges." U.S. Patent No. 1,510,819. 7 Oct. 1924.

Charts
 Barth, C. G. "Carl," Diagram of Functionalized Routing."." Chart 180.

References

Further reading 
 Bjork, Kenneth Saga In Steel And Concrete – Norwegian Engineers In America (Northfield, Minnesota:  Norwegian-American Historical Association, 1947)

External links 

 Carl G. Barth, 1860–1939: A Sketch  By Florence M. Manning

Archives and records
Papers of Carl G. Barth and his son J. Christian Barth at Baker Library Special Collections, Harvard Business School.

1860 births
1939 deaths
American industrial engineers
American management consultants
19th-century American mathematicians
20th-century American mathematicians
Bethlehem Steel people
Harvard University faculty
American mechanical engineers
Norwegian emigrants to the United States
People from Horten